Sondre Fosnæss Hanssen (born 25 May 2001) is a Norwegian footballer currently playing as a defender for Strømsgodset.

A youth product of Strømsgodset, he represented Norway once at U15 international level.

Career statistics

Club

Notes

References

2001 births
Living people
Norwegian footballers
Association football defenders
Eliteserien players
Strømsgodset Toppfotball players
Norway youth international footballers